What the Fields Remember is a documentary film based on the Nellie massacre. It was produced by the Public Service Broadcasting Trust and directed by Subasri Krishnan.

Synopsis

On 18 February 1983, from 9:00 am to 3:00 pm, more than 2000 Muslims were killed in the town of Nellie and its surrounding villages in Assam, India. People's homes were burnt down and their fields destroyed. Most of those who died were old people, women and children. Until today, the Nellie massacre, remains on the margins of India's public history, and is virtually wiped out from the nation's collective memory.

The documentary film What the Fields Remember revisits the massacre three decades later. From the survivors, Sirajuddin Ahmed and Abdul Khayer's, retelling of the event, and their struggles of coping with loss and memories that refuse to fade away, the film attempts to explore ideas of violence, memory and justice. It also tries to understand how physical spaces that have witnessed the violence continue to mark people's relationship to history and memory. What the Fields Remember also attempts to raise larger questions around collective memory – of what we choose to remember and why we choose to forget.

What The Fields Remember is an account of what happened on 18 February 1983 as two survivors, Sirajuddin Ahmed and Abdul Khayer, remember it. Before I began my trips to Nellie, I was confronted with some fundamental questions: What do you ask, and how much do you ask? What does it mean to go 32 years later to people who have been through unimaginable violence and loss, and ask them well-meaning questions, which at the best of times are banal? What form of representation could I choose that could address some of the ethical dilemmas I faced while making the film? And yet, how do we create images, words and sounds that provoke questions or ideas for my subjects? These are questions that documentary film-makers usually face.

Cast
 Research, Script and Director – Subasri Krishnan
 Cinematography and Editing – Amit Mahanti
 Location, Sound and Sound Design/Mix – Julius L. Basaiawmoit
 Editing Consultant – Sameera Jain
 Translation and Transcription – Bedatri D. Choudhury
 Graphics – Chandan Gorana
 Producer – Rajiv Mehrotra (for PSBT)
  Executive Producers – Tulika Srivastava and Ridhima Mehra

References 

Indian documentary films
Documentary films about crime

Nellie massacre